is a railway station located in the city of Noshiro, Akita Prefecture, Japan, operated by East Japan Railway Company (JR East).

Lines

Station layout
Torigata Station one side platform, serving a single bidirectional track. There is no station building, but only a shelter built onto the platform. The unattended station is managed from Noshiro Station.

History
Torigata Station was opened on December 1, 1960 as a station on the JNR (Japan National Railways). With the privatization of the JNR on April 1, 1987, the station has been managed by JR East.

Surrounding area

External links

JR East station information page 

Railway stations in Japan opened in 1960
Railway stations in Akita Prefecture
Gonō Line
Noshiro, Akita